Lennox Clarke is an English professional boxer who has held the British and Commonwealth super-middleweight titles since March 2021.

Professional career
Clarke made his professional debut on 16 November 2013, scoring a second-round technical knockout (TKO) victory against James Child at the Town Hall in Walsall.

After compiling a record of 6–0 (3 KOs), he defeated Dan Blackwell via points decision (PTS) over eight rounds on 21 February 2015, capturing the vacant British Masters Bronze super-middleweight title at the Stadium Suite at the Banks's Stadium in Walsall.

Following eight more wins and one draw, Clarke faced Jahmaine Smyle for the IBO Continental super-middleweight title on 2 December 2017 at the Leicester Arena. Clarke scored a knockdown in the ninth round en route to a unanimous decision (UD) victory to win his second regional title. All three judges scored the bout 97–92.

He scored three more wins before challenging Commonwealth super-middleweight champion Lerrone Richards. The bout took place on 30 November 2019 at the Arena Birmingham, with the vacant British super-middleweight title also on the line. After a closely contested twelve-rounds which saw Clarke march forward as the aggressor while Richards remained on the back foot, boxing at range, Clarke suffered the first defeat of his career, losing via split decision (SD). One judge scored the bout 115–113 in favour of Clarke while the other two scored it 117–112 and 116–113 for Richards.

Professional boxing record

References

External links

Year of birth missing (living people)
Date of birth missing (living people)
Living people
English male boxers
Boxers from Birmingham, West Midlands
Super-middleweight boxers
Light-heavyweight boxers